Pococera asperatella, the maple webworm moth, is a moth of the family Pyralidae. It is found in North America, including Alabama, Illinois, Massachusetts, Minnesota, New Hampshire, New Jersey, North Carolina, Oklahoma, Ontario, Pennsylvania, South Carolina, Tennessee, Texas, Virginia and Wisconsin.

Adults are powdery gray. There is one generation per year.

The larvae have been recorded feeding on the foliage of various hardwood species, including Rhus and Acer species. They are pale yellow to green or even brown or black in color and about 25 mm long when fully grown. Eggs are laid in leaves which are already partly rolled by other species. Young larvae skeletonise these leaves. Older larvae web together groups of leaves.

References

Moths described in 1860
Epipaschiinae
Moths of North America